Nakwasin  is a village in the administrative district of Gmina Mała Wieś, within Płock County, Masovian Voivodeship, in east-central Poland.

References

Nakwasin